Genglou Subdistrict is a subdistrict in Jiande, Zhejiang, China. , it administers the following three residential neighborhoods and 14 villages: 
Genglou Community 
Genghua Community
Dengjia
Zhangjia Village
Luo Village
Houtang Village
Hucenfan Village
Xinshi Village
Huang'ao Village
Ganxi Village
Yuhe Village
Yanyuan Village
Hongzhai Village
Qiaoling Village
Dengjia Village
Shiling Village
Xule Village

See also 
 List of township-level divisions of Zhejiang

References 

Township-level divisions of Zhejiang
Jiande